Richard Blayney, 4th Baron Blayney (died 1670) was an Anglo-Irish politician and official.

Blayney was the third son of Henry Blayney, 2nd Baron Blayney and Jane Moore. In 1656, he was appointed Custos Rotulorum of County Monaghan by Oliver Cromwell, and that year also took his seat in the Second Protectorate Parliament as the Member of Parliament for Cavan, Fermanagh and Monaghan. On 9 February 1759, he was appointed Escheator of Ulster by Richard Cromwell. Following the Stuart Restoration, Blayney was elected as the representative for Monaghan County in the Irish House of Commons, serving between 1661 and 1666. In 1669, he inherited his elder brother's peerage as Baron Blayney; he died the following year.

References

Year of birth unknown
1670 deaths
17th-century Anglo-Irish people
Barons in the Peerage of Ireland
English MPs 1656–1658
Irish MPs 1661–1666
Members of the Parliament of Ireland (pre-1801) for County Monaghan constituencies